The 1914 Victorian state election was held in the Australian state of Victoria on Thursday, 26 November 1914 to elect 49 of the 65 members of the state's Legislative Assembly.

Background 

Politics in the state of Victoria in the previous decade had been a 3-way contest between the Conservative, Liberal and Labor parties. Following the example of the federal party, the Conservative and Liberal factions in Victoria united to form the Liberal Party. This new party dominated politics in the state, forming government with a majority of 43 of 65 seats in the previous election, although a new divide formed between city and rural based MPs.

This divide resulted in a no confidence motion being passed to the government of William Watt, when the rural based Liberal MPs and the opposition Labor MPs defeated the government in December 1913. To much surprise, Governor John Madden appointed the opposition Labor party under George Elmslie to government, although it was impossible to retain its position due to its minority in numbers, and that the law at the time stated that new ministers had to recontest their seats at by-elections.

Watt returned as Premier on 22 December 1913, and remained until he resigned in June 1914 to enter Federal politics. He was replaced by former Premier Alexander Peacock. A month later, World War I broke out. Peacock's administration enthusiastically contributed to the war, and was seeking reelection on this basis.

Results

Legislative Assembly 

|}
Notes:
Sixteen seats were uncontested at this election, and were retained by the incumbent parties:
Liberal (7): Allandale, Borung, Dandenong, Gippsland South, Gippsland West, Gunbower, Lowan,
Labor (9): Abbotsford, Albert Park, Carlton, Collingwood, Fitzroy, Flemington, Geelong, Port Melbourne, Williamstown

See also

Members of the Victorian Legislative Assembly, 1914–1917
Candidates of the 1914 Victorian state election

References

1914 elections in Australia
Elections in Victoria (Australia)
1910s in Victoria (Australia)
November 1914 events